Abrizaki may refer to:
 Abrizaki, Andika
 Abrizaki, Izeh

See also
 Abrizak (disambiguation)